Veronica Vdovicenco (born August 27, 1985 in Chişinău) is a Moldovan swimmer, who specialized in sprint freestyle events. Vdovicenco qualified for the women's 50 m freestyle at the 2008 Summer Olympics in Beijing, by clearing a FINA B-standard entry time of 26.30 from the Belarus Championships in Minsk. She challenged seven other swimmers on the sixth heat, including returning Olympian Ellen Lendra Hight of Zambia. She raced to fifth place by 0.28 of a second behind Christel Simms of the Philippines, with a time of 26.92 seconds. Vdovicenco failed to advance into the semifinals, as she placed fiftieth out of 92 swimmers in the preliminary heats.

References

External links
NBC 2008 Olympics profile

1985 births
Living people
Olympic swimmers of Moldova
Swimmers at the 2008 Summer Olympics
Moldovan female freestyle swimmers
Sportspeople from Chișinău
21st-century Moldovan women